William Parker (died c. 1631) was an Anglican priest. and archdeacon of Cornwall.

Parker was educated at Lincoln College, Oxford. 
He was Archdeacon of Totnes; from 1613 to 1616: and Archdeacon of Cornwall from 1616 until 1628.

References

Archdeacons of Totnes
Archdeacons of Cornwall
17th-century English Anglican priests
Alumni of Lincoln College, Oxford